Charles Corbin (1881–1970) was a French diplomat who served as ambassador to Britain before and during the early part of the Second World War from 1933 to 27 June 1940.

Early life 
He was born in Paris, the son of Paul Corbin, an industrialist. He studied at the Collège Stanislas de Paris, a private Catholic school in which the father of Charles de Gaulle taught. He continued his education at the Faculté des Lettres at the Sorbonne. After World War I, Corbin served in the press bureau of the French Foreign Ministry at the Quai d'Orsay, in Paris. He made many British friends; he spoke English fluently and had a profound sympathy for Britain and British ways. Corbin served as the French ambassador to Spain (1929–31) and to Belgium (1931-33) before being appointed French ambassador to the court of St. James.

Ambassador in London

Chasing "continental commitment"
He was assigned to London as ambassador in 1933. Corbin arrived in London on 13 March 1933 and presented his credentials as the ambassador of the republic to King George V the same day. His knowledge of economic affairs enabled him to arrange and preside skillfully over meetings of French and British civil servants between 1934 and 1939, while the two nations were preparing for war with Germany. The main purpose of Corbin's ambassadorship was to secure the "continental commitment" to have a British commitment to defend France from Germany by sending another expeditionary force on the same scale as in the First World War. The "continental commitment" was the opposite of the "limited liability" defense policy that formed the basis of British rearmament until 1939. Under the "limited liability" doctrine, the majority of the defence budget went to the Royal Air Force and the Royal Navy while the British Army was to be kept so small as to rule out the "continental commitment" ever made again. Under the "limited liability" doctrine, the British Army was to be an all-volunteer force intended to serve mostly as a colonial police force that would be strong enough to allow Britain to defend the colonies in the British Empire, but not to fight a major war with a nation like Germany.

The first major crisis in Anglo-French relations occurred in June 1934, when French Foreign Minister Louis Barthou attempted to create an "Eastern Locarno", a counterpart to the Locarno Treaties of 1925-26 guaranteeing the borders of Western Europe for Eastern Europe with the intent of deter Adolf Hitler from aggression in Eastern Europe. The real purpose of the "Eastern Locarno" was to bring the Soviet Union into a front meant to deter Germany; Barthou frankly told Soviet Foreign Commissar Maxim Litvinov at a meeting in Geneva on 18 May 1934 that if Germany refused to join the "Eastern Locarno" as expected, France would sign a military alliance with the Soviet Union.

Barthou's plans to enlist the Soviet Union as an ally against Germany was extremely unpopular in Britain with Corbin reporting that most British newspapers portrayed the Soviets as a menace and Barthou as reckless and irresponsible for wanting to bring the Soviet Union into an anti-German front. On 14 June 1934, Corbin met the Foreign Secretary, Sir John Simon, who was openly hostile to the French plan for an "Eastern Locarno" and the Permanent Undersecretary, Sir Robert "Van" Vansittart, who was mostly silent during the meeting.

A major dilemma for French decisionmakers in the 1930s was that it was felt in Paris that France could not defeat Germany in another war without Britain, but at the same time, Britain until 1939 was opposed to security commitments in Eastern Europe, where France had a number of allies. The issue of the "Eastern Locarno" was considered so important that on 9–10 July 1934 a French delegation consisting of Barthou, Corbin, the Secretary-General of the Quai d'Orsay Alexis St. Léger, the Political Director René Massigli, and Roland de Margerie met in London with Simon, Vansittart, Sir Anthony Eden, Orme Sargent and Lord Stanhope. The meeting went badly, with Simon stating his belief that Hitler was a man of peace and wanted only to revise the "unjust" Treaty of Versailles, and once that was achieved, would live in harmony with all his neighbors. Simon ridiculed French fears of the Third Reich, and when Barthou said the "Eastern Locarno" was necessary to protect France and its allies in Eastern Europe, Simon incredulously replied, "To protect yourselves from Germany?" Barthou, known as one of the most unyieldieng French politicians, refused to yield to Simon's objections while St. Léger and Corbin were more conciliatory. St. Léger spoke of the "fundamental importance that France attached to her friendship with England. She does not want to do anything against Great Britain. Better still, the French government does not wish to get into anything without Great Britain".

Making friends in London
A man of great charm, distinguished appearance and elegant manners who was fluent in English, Corbin was a favorite of the British Establishment and a dinner invitation with him was a great and much sought after honor. Corbin in his dispatches to Paris made clear his personal preference for anti-appeasement Conservative MPs byu often favorably mentioning Winston Churchill, Leo Amery, Alfred Duff Cooper, General Edward Spears, and Sir Anthony Eden together with the Francophile National Labour MP Harold Nicolson. Corbin noted in his dispatches to Paris a connection between Francophilia and an anti-appeasement stance by commenting that those MPs most inclined to be Francophiles like Churchill, Duff Cooper, Spears, Amery and Nicolson were the ones most likely to be opposed to appeasement. Through Nicolson and his wife, the novelist Lady Vita Sackville-West, Corbin was well connected to the British aristocracy, but Corbin found the bohemian Sackville-West not to match his idea about what a British aristocrat should be like. The French historian Jean-Baptiste Duroselle wrote that Corbin's dispatches from London were not of the same literary quality as those of André François-Poncet, the French ambassador in Berlin from 1931 to 1938, whose dispatches are regarded as classics of French writing as he produced a memorably laced-in-acid picture of German society, but Corbin's dispatches were still models of elegant, precise French favored by the Quai d'Orsay, and there was much to be learned about British politics and high society from 1933 to 1940 from reading Corbin's dispatches. Duroselle described Corbin as a man with a very legalistic mind, who favored precise language and was a stickler for details.

The British official that Corbin was most close to was Sir Robert "Van" Vansittart, the francophile Permanent Undersecretary at the Foreign Office between 1930–37, whom Corbin called a true friend of France. Vansittart sometimes leaked material to Corbin in attempts to sabotage his government's policies. Corbin during his time in London was usually frustrated by the widespread attitude in Britain that the Treaty of Versailles was a French-designed "Carthaginian peace" that was far too harsh on Germany and that it was the French who were the principle trouble-makers in Europe by seeking to uphold the treaty. He founded his Anglophilia severely tested by the anti-Versailles and anti-French views held by much of the British people and Establishment.

In his private conversations with Vansittart, Corbin often vented his frustration with the tendency of so many in Britain to see Germany as the wronged nation, the "victim of Versailles" that Britain should help. In the same way, Corbin with his love of precision was exasperated by the usually vague assurances of British politicians and officials, who told him that Britain wanted to be a friend of France, was opposed to any nation dominating Europe and wanted to avoid another war and that aspects of the international system created by the Treaty of Versailles needed to be revised in the favor of Germany. For his part, Corbin in his usual polite and gentlemanly way made clear his disagreement with the direction of British foreign policy and that he supported an Anglo-French alliance to uphold the system created by the Treaty of Versailles against efforts of Germany to challenge the system.

From Sudetenland Crisis to Munich Agreement
In December 1937, when Vansittart was "kicked upstairs" to the meaningless post of Chief Diplomatic Adviser, whose advice was always ignored, to be replaced with Sir Alexander Cadogan, Corbin was disappointed. In contrast to his friendship with Vansittart, Corbin was usually negative in his dispatches to Paris towards the "big four" of British politics in the 1930s, Sir John Simon, Lord Halifax, Sir Samuel Hoare and Neville Chamberlain, all of whom he clearly disliked. Through Corbin was always outwardly polite and courteous towards Chamberlain, Hoare, Halifax and Simon, his dispatches to Paris made plain his real feelings. Chamberlain as the most committed supporter within the Cabinet of the "limited liability" doctrine was Corbin's bete noir.

In a speech about defence policy, Chamberlain stated: "We shall never again sent to the Continent an army on the scale of that which we put into the field of the Great War" The War Minister, Leslie Hore-Belisha, agreed, telling the House of Commons: "Our Army should be organised to defend this country and the empire...to organise it with a military prepossession in favor of a continental commitment is wrong".      

On 21 March 1938, Foreign Minister Joseph Paul-Boncour instructed Corbin to seek to "interest" the British in Eastern Europe, especially in the states of the cordon sanitaire: Czechoslovakia, Poland, Romania and Yugoslavia. On 23 March 1938, Paul-Boncour stated in his instructions for Corbin that the French had intelligence that German rearmament had not reached a point that the Reich could fight a long war, and if France mobilised with full British support, that would force the Wehrmacht to concentrate its strength along the West Wall and make any German aggression in Eastern Europe impossible. Paul-Boncour concluded that France did not want a war with Germany, but a strategy of deterrence, instead of appeasement, would be the best way to achieve peace.

On 7 April 1938, Corbin reported to Paris that he received intelligence from an unnamed friend in the British government that was evidently leaked that sources within the Italian government had informed the British embassy in Rome that Hitler was pressuring Mussolini to undertake an aggressively-anti-French foreign policy to distract France from its allies in the cordon sanitaire. Corbin reported that Hitler visited Rome in May 1938 and would expectedly make an arrangement with Mussolini that Germany would support Italian ambitions in the Mediterranean in exchange for Italian support for German ambitions in Eastern Europe. However, Paul-Boncour's strategy of deterrence diplomacy was abandoned with the fall of the government in Léon Blum in Paris as the new premier, Edouard Daladier, appointed as his foreign minister, Georges Bonnet, who was hostile to the idea of France going to war for the sake of its allies in the cordon sanitarire. Corbin reported to Paris in April 1938 that the British public was "alarmed" by the possibility of peace conscription, which was the prequesite of the "continental commitment". During Daladier's visit to London in April 1938, Lord Halifax told him that a France could expect only two British Army divisions to assist with the defence of France, a force that the French regarded as completely inadequate.     

On 11 July 1938, Corbin met with Herbert von Dirksen, the German ambassador to the Court of St. James. Corbin reported to Paris that Dirksen had told him, "The British people... increasingly tend to envisage the destruction of an air war as the inevitable result of German aggression against Great Britain", which Dirksen saw as a positive development. Dirksen told Corbin that there as long as the British people believed that the Luftwaffe would destroy their cities, there was less chance of British "aggression" against Germany. Dirksen further advised Corbin that for that reason, France should not count on Britain if it decided to honour the 1924 French-Czechoslovak Alliance, which committed France to go to war with any nation that attacked Czechoslovakia. However, Corbin also reported that Dirksen had complained to him that "public opinion is currently against Germany".

When Chamberlain returned to London from Munich on 30 September 1938 after he had signed the Munich Agreement and the Anglo-German Declaration, Corbin was not there to greet him at Heston Airport despite being invited. The snub was noticed by both the British and the French press at the time. In October 1938, Bonnet demoted René Massigli, the anti-appeasement Political Director of the Quai d'Orsay, by making him ambassador to Turkey while Pierre Comert of the Press Department was sent to the French embassy in Washington. Bonnet would have also liked to demote Corbin, whom he knew to be opposed to his policies, but he lacked an obvious replacement. The British historian D.C Watt called Corbin "a determined opponent of any weakness towards Germany on either side of the Channel".

War scares: winter of 1938-1939
Corbin reported the British public opinion had supported the Munich Agreement, but he noted as October 1938 went on, public opinion was "in disarray". In the fall of 1938, Corbin reported to Paris that several right-wing newspapers, most notably the newspaper chain owned by the Canadian media magnate Lord Beaverbrook, whose flagship paper was The Daily Express, were calling for a peacetime conscription, which he took as a sign that the British public was turning against appeasement. Corbin was following his own agenda in his dispatches, as he wanted to convince Daladier and other decisionmakers in Paris that the British public and government were starting to favour "firmness" towards the Reich as a way to undercut Bonnet's foreign policy of giving Germany a "free hand in the East" in exchange for leaving France alone. Corbin reported that there was a growing demand in Britain for "if not conscription pure and simple, at least a form of 'national service'". In November 1938, Corbin reported that one public opinion poll showed that most British people favoured a "national registry" of young men. At the same time, Corbin told Foreign Secretary Lord Halifax that there was growing defeatism in France and that Bonnet had his own agenda of reaching an understanding with the Reich that might very well be at Britain's expense.

To counter Bonnet, Corbin urged Halifax that Britain should make an effort to stand by France such as making the "continental commitment" and said that as long the French believed the British "would fight to the last Frenchman", the appeal of Bonnet would continue to grow. On 1 November 1938, Lord Halifax in a dispatch to Sir Eric Phipps, the British ambassador in Paris, stated his fear that France would "turn so defeatist as to give up the struggle of maintaining adequate forces even for the safety of metropolitan France". Corbin also wrote to urge Paris to confront Chamberlain on the conscription issue: "Must we wait six months as in 1914 for the 'first hundred thousand' to make their appearance on our soil?" Corbin was assisted in a way that were not entirely proper by General Sir Henry Pownall, the Director of Military Operations and Intelligence in the British Army, who leaked information to him to assist him with pressuring Chamberlain to make the "continental commitment". Corbin's friendship with several anti-appeasement Conservative MPs such as Churchill, Eden, Duff Cooper and Amerey encouraged his tendency to argue for a foreign policy that would be more in tune with the anti-appeasers than with the appeasers.

In January 1939, the Chamberlain cabinet was rocked by the "Dutch war scare" when false information planted by the French appear that alleged that Germany was about to invade the Netherlands with the aim of using Dutch airfields to bomb Britain. Chamberlain's "limited liability" doctrine of keeping the British Army so weak as to rule out the "continental commitment" came back to haunt him during the war scare. As the British Army could not defend the Netherlands on its own, the only nation with an army strong enough to save the Netherlands was France. During the war scare, Corbin pressed William Stang to have his government make the "continental commitment" by saying that it would be impossible for France to go to war to defend Britain if Britain was unwilling to do anything to defend France. On 1 February 1939, Corbin handed Stang a note saying that if Britain was not willing to do defend France, France would not be willing to defend Britain.

On 6 February 1939, Chamberlain told the House of Commons that Britain was "guaranteeing" France and said that any attack on France by Germany or Italy would result in an automatic British declaration of war on the aggressor. Chamberlain's statement gratified Corbin, but he continued to press very strongly for peacetime conscription in Britain by saying that the "guarantee" was worthless without conscription. At the same time, Corbin remained very critical of the Labour Party, which had philosophical reasons for opposing peacetime conscription as a major obstacle as Labour leaders vowed to campaign against conscription if introduced at the next general election.

Corbin was forced to explain in a dispatch to Paris that in France conscription to defend the motherland was something almost all Frenchmen supported, but "the psychological atmosphere is not the same in Britain... to the French Trade Unionist, as to all compatriots the idea that conscription should be undemocratic is impossible to grasp". Corbin explained to Paris that to British trade unions, the Labour Party and the British left in general, peacetime conscription was a major violation of basic human rights, and even if the Chamberlain government was willing to bring in conscription, there would be significant domestic opposition. However, Corbin noted that several Labour MPs such as Hugh Gaitskell and Douglas Jay were speaking in favour of peacetime conscription by arguing the Labour Party was making a mockery of its opposition to fascism by also opposing conscription. Corbin reported the violent anti-British media campaign launched in Germany in November 1938 was starting to have some effect and that more and more British people were speaking in favour of conscription as the winter of 1938-1939 went on.

Danzig Crisis: last days of peace, 1939
In March 1939, in response to the Tilea Affair, Chamberlain proposed a four-power declaration by Britain, France, Poland and the Soviet Union that they would defend Romania from a German attack. Corbin, with his usual love of precise language, was described as being horrified by the vague language of Chamberlain's proposed draft, and it was after much consultation with him that the draft for the statement to protect Romania was made much clearer and more precise. Ivan Maisky, the Soviet ambassador in London, talked with Corbin on 29 March 1939 during which Corbin predicated that very soon Britain would make "guarantees" of Poland and Romania and that the United Kingdom seemed "more willing than at any time in the past to accept obligations" in Eastern Europe".

Given the traditional British opposition to any sort of security commitments in Eastern Europe, Corbin was astonished by the speech given by Prime Minister Chamberlain before the House of Commons on 31 March 1939 announcing the "guarantee" of Poland. Corbin reported to Bonnet on 4 April 1939: "Had I been told three weeks ago that during this time period the British government would have guaranteed the independence of Poland... that such a decision would have been cheered by a nearly unanimous Parliament and that no opposition to it would appear in the press or the public, I would have no doubt greeted such a forecast with an incredulous smile.... The new orientation given to British foreign representing such a complete break with the traditional position is so important that it may be said without exaggeration as being of historical magnitude.... The objective was to oppose the establishment of German hegemony over continental Europe.... The dissenting Conservatives that Messers Eden, Churchill and Duff Cooper usually represented immediately rallied in support of the government. On 26 April 1939, Chamberlain announced to the House of Commons that for the first time in British history, peacetime conscription would be introduced and that a British expeditionary force would be sent to defend France in the event of a war with Germany, thus achieving one of the central goals of French diplomacy, namely the "continental commitment". Corbin reported the introduction of peacetime conscription "will have immense reverberations across the world, particularly in France where it has been waited for with such anxiety". Corbin was too modest to note that the pressure he had applied in the winter of 1938-1939 via leaks to the British newspapers had played a major role in that decision.

In the summer of 1939, Corbin poured so much scorn on a proposal to have Pope Pius XII mediate an end to the Danzig crisis by pointing out the impracticalities posed by having the well-known Germanophile pontiff serving as a supposedly neutral mediator that Bonnet was forced to give up the idea. During the debates within the French cabinet between Daladier and Bonnet in August 1939 about going to war with Poland, Corbin strengthened Daladier's hand by reporting that Britain approved of his foreign policy, much to the intense fury of Bonnet, who wanted Corbin to report the opposite. On 27 August 1939, Corbin at present at a meeting between Sir Alexander Cadogan, the permanent undersecretary at the Foreign Office, and the Swedish businessman Birger Dahlerus, who been trying to play amateur diplomat by negotiating an end to the Danzig Crisis. Corbin had been worried that Britain was using Daherus to negotiate behind France's back and so Cadogan invited him to hear him lecture Dahlerus that Germany's "gangster policy would have to cease". On the night of 30 August, German Foreign Minister Joachim von Ribbentrop gave Sir Nevile Henderson, the British ambassador in Berlin, the German "final offer" demanding for a Polish envoy to arrive in Berlin that night to discuss the resolution of the Danzig Crisis. Chamberlain called Corbin that night to say he thought Hitler was bluffing and the peace could still be saved.

As Italy was not ready for war in 1939, despite the offensive alliance known as the Pact of Steel, Italian Foreign Minister Count Galeazzo Ciano proposed an international conference for 5 September 1939, to be chaired by Mussolini, to discuss the crisis. Lord Halifax asked Corbin for French reaction to the Italian peace plan. Bonnet was in favor of the Italian plan for a conference, but needed the approval of the French cabinet and complained that Daladier refused to call a cabinet meeting to discuss Mussolini's conference. Daladier told Sir Eric Phipps, the British ambassador in Paris, that would rather resign than attend the proposed conference and that it would be a "second Munich".

On the morning of 1 September 1939, Germany invaded Poland. Corbin telephoned the Foreign Office to ask how best Britain and France should co-ordinate the declarations of war on Germany. Bonnet had sent a message to London asking that Britain and France instead attend the proposed conference, which Corbin distorted by arguing for a time limit for German acceptance on attending the conference, which caused much confusion when Bonnet said there would be no time limit. As Bonnet did not wish to see France declare war, he decided to take up the mediation offer made by Mussolini and instructed Corbin in a phone call at 3:40 pm to tell Chamberlain that he wanted a British commitment to attend Mussolini's proposed conference. However, at 4:10 pm on 1 September 1939, Corbin telephoned Bonnet to say that Lord Halifax had told him that Britain would not take part in the Italian plan for a peace conference unless Germany pulled out all of its forces from Poland immediately.

At 5:30 pm, Corbin tele-texted the instructions that Lord Halifax had given to Henderson to Bonnet to indicate the direction that British policy was going. On the evening of 2 September 1939, a major crisis emerged in Britain, as no declaration of war had been issued, which led to a "sit-down strike" at 10 Downing Street as the Chancellor of the Exchequer, Sir John Simon, previously regarded as one of the men most loyal to Chamberlain, refused to leave 10 Downing Street until he received a promise that Britain would declare war on Germany. As a sign of Allied solidarity, it was felt necessary to time the Anglo-French declarations of war on Germany together, but a major battle in the French cabinet between Daladier who wanted to declare war,  Bonnet, who disagreed, made that impossible. France needed to mobilize six million men in the event of war. Corbin issued a press statement on 2 September 1939 in response to angry British callers to remind them that France had to mobilize six million men, which meant a massive degree of disruption to the French economy, and that if Britain had to call a similar number of men to the colors all at once, that too would take some time.

With the backdrop of heavy thunderstorm, Corbin was summoned to 10 Downing Street on the evening of 2 September and discovered a scene of chaos with Chamberlain, Lord Halifax and Cadogan all telephoning Paris in attempts to get hold of Daladier, Bonnet or anybody else in the French government who might be able to tell them what was going on in France. Corbin was told by Chamberlain that his government was on the verge of collapse and predicted the House of Commons would pass a motion of no-confidence against his government the next morning if he did not make a decision to declare war on Germany at once. Corbin told Chamberlain that the French cabinet was badly divided between Daladier and Bonnet and that he did not know when France would make a decision to declare war. Chamberlain also had Corbin speak to Simon to assure him that the reason for the delay in declaring war was the crisis in Paris, not because the prime minister was seeking a way to avoid honouring his commitments to Poland. Corbin was told at about 11:30 pm that the cabinet had approved of the decision to send an ultimatum to Germany at 9 am on the morning of September 3 that would expire at 11 am, and there was to be no co-ordination with France in presenting the declarations of war.

At 9 am on 3 September 1939, Sir Nevile Henderson, the British ambassador in Berlin, handed over the ultimatum demanding Germany cease its war against Poland, or Britain would declare war at 11 am that day. Shortly after 11 am, King George VI went on the BBC to announce Britain was at war. At 12:30 pm, Robert Coulondre, the French ambassador in Berlin handed over the ultimatum saying France would declare at 5 pm if Germany did not end its war against Poland.

From Phoney War to Fall of France
In the fall of 1939 and the winter of 1940, Corbin was closely involved in the Anglo-French discussions about war aims. The French wanted to undo the Anschluss and insisted that Austria be restored, but the British were willing to accept Austria as part of Germany. Finally, a compromise stated that after the Allied victory, a plebiscite would be held to determine if the Austrians wanted their independence back or not. Both the French and the British agreed on restoring Czechoslovakia, but the British held to the frontiers imposed by the Munich Agreement and signalled a willingness to leave the Sudetenland as part of Germany, but the French wanted Czechoslovakia restored to the pre-Munich frontiers.

However, on other issues, agreement was more possible with both the French and the British agreeing that Poland was to be restored and that all land annexed by Germany was to be returned to Poland, but the question of whatever the parts of Poland annexed by the Soviet Union were to be restored was left ambiguous, and British officials noted that most of the people in the areas annexed by the Soviets were not Polish. Finally, both the French and British agreed that it was not possible to make peace with Hitler, and a new government was needed in Germany, but the British were most insistent that the Allies offer lenient peace terms to post-Hitler government by arguing that a promise of a harsh peace would only drive more Germans to Hitler.

During the Phoney War, in February 1940, Count Edward Bernard Raczyński, the ambassador in London representing the Polish government-in-exile, appealed to Corbin for help in seeking a British statement that German war criminals would be punished after the Allied victory. In January 1940, the Polish government-in-exile published a press statement detailing widespread German crimes in Poland right from the start of the war on 1 September 1939 and asked that the perpetrators of these crimes be punished after the Allied victory. Both Corbin and Raczyński noted there was a precedent by citing the Anglo-French-Russian declaration of May 1915, which called the Armenian genocide a "crime against humanity", which was the first use of the term, and promised to bring the leaders of the Ottoman Empire to justice after the Allied victory though the failure to start war crimes trials for the leaders of the Committee of Union and Progress in 1919-1922 for political reasons was a less auspicious precedent. At the time, it was the hope of the British government that the Wehrmacht would overthrow Hitler and so the British government was absolutely opposed to idea of punishing German officials and officers for war crimes in Poland in the belief that a statement promising to do so might frighten the Wehrmacht into staying loyal to Hitler. It was only in 1941-1942 after the British finally lost patience with the Wehrmacht, which stayed resolutely loyal to Hitler, that they finally becvame willing to issue statements promising to bring war criminals to justice.

Corbin joined Raczyński in February to April 1940 seeking to lobby Lord Halifax to issue a statement promising to bring war criminals to justice, despite Halifax's objections that such a statement would only make the Wehrmacht more loyal to Hitler. Halifax took the view that the Allies should be trying to divide the Nazis from the Wehrmacht, which meant no commitments to war crimes trials. After much lobbying, Raczyński and Corbin got Lord Halifax to issue a joint Anglo-French-Polish statement saying the countries held "the German government responsible for these crimes and they affirm their determination to right the wrongs inflicted on the Polish people". The statement of 18 April 1940 accused Germany of "brutal attacks upon the civilian population of Poland in defiance of the accepted principles of international law" and of "a policy deliberately aiming at the destruction of the Polish nation" and mentioned the "atrocious treatment" inflicted on the Jewish community of Poland. However, Lord Halifax told Corbin and Raczyński that the British regarded the statement of 18 April 1940 as only a "statement of principle", not a "contractual obligation" like the Anglo-French-Russian Declaration of 1915, and that his government was still opposed to the war crimes trials. He repeated his standard claim the Allies should try to divide the Wehrmacht from the Nazis.

Corbin was with Jean Monnet on 16 June 1940 when the proposal for the union of France and United Kingdom was put to Charles de Gaulle, who had been sent to London by tFrench Premier Paul Reynaud. The proposed Declaration of Union was a desperate last-minute attempt to bolster French resistance in the face of defeatism among the ranks of the French cabinet to keep the Franco-British alliance alive. De Gaulle was staying at the Hyde Park Hotel and was shaving when Corbin and Monnet burst into his room to bring their plan for an Anglo-French union to keep France in the war. De Gaulle was hostile to the plan for Anglo-French union on philosophical grounds, but he was prepared to accept anything that might keep France in the war since he knew full well that Reynaud was losing the cabinet debates with Marshal Pétain, who was openly defeatist and urging the French cabinet to sign an armistice with Germany. On the afternoon of 16 June, de Gaulle and Corbin met with the British Cabinet, which approved of the plan, and as such Churchill and de Gaulle signed the statement of Anglo-French union declaring that the United Kingdom and France were now united in "the unyielding resolution in their common defense of freedom and justice, against subjection to a system which reduces mankind to a life of robots and slaves".

Under the statement of Anglo-French union, the French National Assembly and the British Parliament were to become one; there was to be single War Cabinet in charge of all Anglo-French forces all over the world; and there were to be joint organs for the direction of financial, economic, foreign and military policies. Churchill congratulated de Gaulle on signing the statement of union by saying that he was going to become the Commander-in-chief of all the Anglo-French forces in the world, but King George VI was not informed of the plan and was openly hostile when he heard about it. he wondered if the union of the French republic and the British monarchy now meant he was out of a job. Reynaud embraced the plan for Anglo-French union, but Pétain rejected it as a British plan to take over the French colonial empire and convinced the French Cabinet to reject it. On 17 June 1940, Reynaud's government fell after the 9 ministers came out against his plans to continue the war and for the Anglo-French union and President Albert Lebrun appointed Pétain as the new premier.

The first action of the new Petain government was to announce that France would seek an armistice with Germany. In response, de Gaulle went on the BBC on 18 June 1940 in a radio address to denounce Petain and to say to continue the war. On 21 June 1940, France signed an armistice with Germany. On 23 June 1940, de Gaulle announced the formation of a French National Committee, which the British supported but not did recognize as a government-in-exile, unlike for Poland, Czechoslovakia, Norway, the Netherlands and Belgium.

Resignation as ambassador and rest of World War II
On 26 June 1940, Corbin resigned as the French ambassador to the Court of St. James by saying he could not go on. Corbin told Lord Halifax that day it was a "sad decision" to resign but that Roger Cambon, who would take over the embassy, was a capable man. De Gaulle asked for Corbin not to resign but to0 represent his National Committee to the British government, but Corbin stated that the war was lost and that he was now leaving for Brazil while there was still time. Corbin in one of his last acts as ambassador advised the British not to be too closely associated with de Gaulle's National Committee by saying that would make de Gaulle appear to be a British puppet. Corbin made his "tender farewells" to his friends in Britain and left for Brazil in July 1940. De Gaulle's biographer, Jean Lacouture, states that Corbin resigned from the Quai d'Orsay but retired to South America.

Corbin was greatly angered by the British attack on the French naval base at Mers-el-Kébir on 3 July 1940 and said that he could not in good conscience remain in a country that had just attacked his own nation. Corbin was also further angered by the decision of the new Churchill government to extend the British blockade of Germany to France after 21 June 1940 and by the tone of the British media in the summer of 1940, which openly mocked the French as cowards and defeatists for signing the armistice with Germany. For an Anglophile like Corbin, the sustained anti-French tone of the British media, which sneered at and mocked the French for the misfortune of losing to Germany, was a very bitter blow and hurt him deeply. In the summer of 1940, with Britain facing a German invasion, there was a tendency on the part of the many in the British media to blame the French for the United Kingdom's predicament.

Corbin arrived in Rio de Janeiro in August 1940, where he was described as being a deeply depressed man, who was convinced that Germany was going to win the war and the "New Order in Europe" could not be challenged. In December 1940, Corbin made his peace with the "New Order in Europe" by saying in a public statement he awaiting for instructions from Marshal Petain in Vichy for what his role would be in the "New Order", He then denied it to his friends, which caused him a major credibility crisis, with many uncertain about where he stood. In February 1941, Corbin arrived in Lisbon, where Daniel Roché, the second secretary of the French legation in Dublin, tried to persuade to go back to Brazil. Sir Ronald Campbell, the British ambassador to Portugal, wrote after meeting Corbin that "he struck me as rather bitter and distinctly flabby.... There is no fight in him and he gives the impression of a broken man". Campbell further wrote that Corbin was extremely embittered by Mers-el-Kébir, which he took as a personal betrayal, and that Corbin was obsessed with "the ghastly spectacle of starving children" in France, which he blamed on the British blockade.

In March 1941, Corbin arrived in Madrid, where Hoare, who was now serving as the British ambassador to Spain, reported to London that Corbin was a "defeatist" who believed Germany was "invincible". Once Corbin arrived in France later in March 1941, his "black mood" finally lifted, and he refused an offer from Marshal Petain to serve as the ambassador in Washington. Instead, Corbin retired to his cottage in southern France, where his private letters became sharply critical of Vichy. However, he did not take part in the Resistance and said that he was too old for such activities. The British historian Nicholas Atkin described Corbin's attitude as an ambivalent, as he was opposed in principle to the "New Order" but was also convinced for a considerable period of time, at least until 1942, that Germany was going to win the war and that resistance was futile.

References

Books 
 
 
 

 
 Lacouture, Jean. De Gaulle: The Rebel 1890–1944 (1984; English ed. 1991), 
 
 
 
 

1880s births
1970 deaths
Ambassadors of France to the United Kingdom
Ambassadors of France to Spain
Ambassadors of France to Belgium
Collège Stanislas de Paris alumni
War scare